Fomkino is a rural locality (a village) in Kubenskoye Rural Settlement, Vologodsky District, Vologda Oblast, Russia. The population was 10 as of 2002.

Geography 
Fomkino is located 39 km northwest of Vologda (the district's administrative centre) by road. Turutino is the nearest rural locality.

References 

Rural localities in Vologodsky District